Liberation Day (aka Fallen Haven: Liberation Day) is an isometric turn-based strategy game published by Interactive Magic in 1998 for PC. It is the sequel to the 1997 game Fallen Haven. It is set in the 24th century following a war between humans and aliens.

Reviews
Electric Games (1998)
The Adrenaline Vault (May 16, 1998)
PC Zone (Aug 13, 2001)

References

External links
 

1998 video games
Turn-based strategy video games
Video games developed in Canada
Windows games
Windows-only games